Giuseppe Gerbi (born 13 September 1955) is an Italian male retired long-distance runner, steeplechaseer, than at the end of his career he became a marathon runner, he finished 6th in the 3000 m steeplechase at the 1980 Summer Olympics.

Biography
He won fournational championships at senior level, and he also was the winner of the 1983 Rome City Marathon. After his retirement from  athletics  he became a  medical  provider in Turin.

National records
 3000 metres steeplechase: 8:18.47,  Moscow, 31 July 1980. Record held until 5 August 1980.
One hour: 20,483 m,  Rome, 17 April 1982. Current holder.
25,000 metres: 1:16:40.0,  Novi Ligure, 10 April 1983. Current holder.

Achievements

National titles
Italian Athletics Championships
5000 metres: 1976
Marathon: 1982, 1983
Italian Athletics Indoor Championships
3000 metres: 1977

See also
 Italian all-time top lists - 3000 metres steeplechase
 List of Italian records in athletics

References

External links
 
 Giuseppe Gerbi  at All-Athletics

1955 births
Italian male marathon runners
Italian male middle-distance runners
Italian male long-distance runners
Italian male steeplechase runners
Olympic athletes of Italy
Living people
Athletes (track and field) at the 1980 Summer Olympics
People from Collegno
Sportspeople from the Metropolitan City of Turin